The Open Handset Alliance (OHA) is a consortium of 84 firms to develop open standards for mobile devices. Member firms include HTC, Sony, Dell, Intel, Motorola, Qualcomm, Texas Instruments, Google, Samsung Electronics, LG Electronics, T-Mobile, Sprint Corporation (now merged with T-Mobile US), Nvidia, and Wind River Systems.

History
The OHA was established on November 5, 2007, led by Google with 34 members, including mobile handset makers, application developers, some mobile network operators and chip makers. Android, the flagship software of the alliance, is based on an open-source license and has competed against mobile platforms from Apple (iOS), Microsoft (Windows Phone), Nokia (Symbian), HP (formerly Palm), Samsung Electronics / Intel (Tizen, bada), and BlackBerry (BlackBerry OS).

As part of its efforts to promote a unified Android platform, OHA members are contractually forbidden from producing devices that are based on competing forks of Android.

Products
At the same time as the announcement of the formation of the Open Handset Alliance on November 5, 2007, the OHA also unveiled  Android Open Source Project, an open-source mobile phone platform based on the Linux kernel. An early look at the SDK was released to developers on November 12, 2007.

The first commercially available phone running Android was the HTC Dream (also known as the T-Mobile G1). It was approved by the Federal Communications Commission (FCC) on August 18, 2008, and became available on October 22 of that year.

Members

The members of the Open Handset Alliance are:

See also
 Google Nexus
 Symbian Foundation
 LiMo Foundation
 Open Mobile Alliance
 Automotive Grade Linux

References

External links
 Open Handset Alliance official website
 Automotive Grade Linux official website

2007 establishments in California
Android (operating system)
Business organizations based in the United States
Mobile technology
Mobile telecommunications standards
Open standards
Organizations based in Santa Clara County, California
Organizations established in 2007
Technology consortia
Telecommunications organizations
Mountain View, California